Jambhul Aakhyan is a folk tale found in Maharashtra. This describes how Draupadi confesses love for Karna. The tale is not a part of the Sanskrit epic of Mahabharata but is a minor folk poem of the state of Maharashtra.

References 

Folk poetry